Rollin Jarrett (born Rollin Jewett, April 15, 1960) is an American actor, screenwriter, author, playwright and singer-songwriter.

Early life
Jarrett was born in Charlotte, North Carolina, the youngest of four brothers. His family moved to Miami, Florida when he was three and later settled in Fort Lauderdale, Florida where Jarrett attended Fort Lauderdale High School. In school, Jarrett's participation in the arts, acting in plays as well as writing for the school's creative writing journal, earned him a spot in the 1978 edition of Who's Who Among American High School Students. After high school, Jarrett attended Florida State University where he was a Theatre major. Classmate and friend Alan Ball cast Jarrett in his original play, "Dickinson Hall", which premiered at the university in 1980. After college, Jarrett returned to Miami and began auditioning for plays, films, commercials and print work.

Career
Jarrett's career began in South Florida, where he was a successful stage and commercial actor and print model. His first feature film role was in the teen comedy "Summer Job", where he played an effete hairdresser. Next came minor roles in such films as The Bodyguard with Kevin Costner and Whitney Houston as well as Miami Vice and Unsolved Mysteries. Jarrett also hosted several nationally syndicated television shows, such as "Flight," "American Automotive," and "Better Farming" for SportsChannel America, as well as an exercise video with world championship boxer Alexis Arguello called "Boxercise." In 1992, Jarrett journeyed to Los Angeles and turned his attention to screenwriting. His original screenplay Laws of Deception was made into a film in 1997 and starred C. Thomas Howell, James Russo and Brian Austin Green and was directed by Joey Travolta, brother of John Travolta. Jarrett had a small role in this film as Mr. Farina, a corrupt businessman. Another original script entitled American Vampire was produced and starred Carmen Electra, Sydney Lassick, and Adam West. It was Carmen Electra's first feature. In 2003, Jarrett appeared as a contestant on the brainy television game show Jeopardy! as Rollin Jewett. In 2004, Jarrett was commissioned by Scott Reeves and Aaron Benward, the popular country music duo known as Blue County, to write a script in which they were to costar as brothers in a fictional place called Blue County. As the duo's music became more popular, the film was postponed and Benward and Reeves used the name for their band, which is still touring today. In 2017, his feature screenplay "Demons 4 Dummies" was a finalist in the Final Draft Big Break Screenwriting Contest.

In 2011, Jarrett went back to using his given name, Rollin Jewett. An accomplished singer-songwriter, his heartfelt ballad "Arizona Sun" won the Chicago IMSTA FESTA (International Songwriting Competition) Award in July 2015, and won the same award in 2016 with his outlaw rocker "Ride Tall". His music has been licensed multiple times on compilation albums and international music platforms such as iHeartRadio, Amazon, Google Play, Deezer, Yandex, Anghami, Tidal, Slacker, Musicme and others.

As an author and poet, Jewett's work has been published in anthologies and magazines such as Fell Beasts and Fair: A Noblebright Fantasy Anthology, Gathering Storm Magazine, Ghost Stories, Fantasia New Fairy Tale Anthology, Vagabonds, Havik, The Sea Letter, Abstract Magazine International, Literary Heist, Fterota Logia, Fantasia Divinity, The Write Launch, Wordsmith, Dragon Poet Review, Coffin Bell, Meow Meow Pow Pow, and Union Penumbra, among others.  
	
As a playwright, Jewett's comedic play "A Blind Date" was performed by Cary Playwright's Forum at SPARKcon 2015, a yearly interdisciplinary creativity, art & design festival in downtown Raleigh, NC. In 2016, Jewett's play "Our Little Secret" was an award winner in the Helen Jean Play Contest and a semi-finalist in the LaBute New Play Festival. Later in 2016, his play "Teddy Tells All" was also an award winner in the Helen Jean Play Contest. In March 2017, his play "A Blind Date" was broadcast nationally on National Public Radio and performed by Shoestring Radio Theatre. In May 2017, his short comedy "Help Me Get Over You" was also performed on National Public Radio by Shoestring Radio Theatre. Jewett's refugee drama "Buzzkill" was a finalist in the Birdhouse Theatre's 2017 Edgefest. In July 2017, his play "Help Me Get Over You" debuted at the first annual East End Fringe Festival in Riverhead, New York. In November 2017, his play "A Blind Date" premiered Off-Off-Broadway at the Producer's Club, produced by Love Creek Productions. His play "Help Me Get Over You" won the third place award Off-Broadway at the Downtown Urban Arts Festival (DUAF) in 2018 and was also performed at the Boxfest Detroit Theatre Festival in 2018. His short play "Socky Tells All" was seen in July 2018 at the ArtsCenter in Carrboro and also at The Cary Theatre in Cary, North Carolina. Also in 2018 "Buzzkill" was a finalist in the LaBute New Play Festival and was produced by Nylon Fusion Theatre Company in New York. It was also the winner of the Ten Minute Play category at The Renegade Theatre Festival in Lansing, MI in August. His play "Teddy Tells All" was produced at The Silver Spring Stage One Act Festival in Silver Spring, MD also in August 2018. Some of his plays are published by Lazy Bee Scripts and can also be found on the New Play Exchange.

Personal
Jarrett is the great-great grandson of the first president of Panama, Manuel Amador Guerrero. He married Debra Ables (Showgirls), a professional dancer, in Panama City, Panama in 2003 during the 100-year anniversary celebration of that nation as a guest of president Mireya Moscoso. They have one son.

References
Screen World 1993: Comprehensive Pictoral and Statistical Record of the 1992 Movie Season

J! Archive - Rollin Jewett

IMSTA - Festa
Theater review: Five playwrights walk into a bar

External links

1960 births
Living people
Writers from Fort Lauderdale, Florida
Male actors from North Carolina
Male actors from Charlotte, North Carolina
Male actors from Miami
Male actors from Fort Lauderdale, Florida
Fort Lauderdale High School alumni
Writers from Charlotte, North Carolina